The Asia Pacific Lacrosse Championship (also known as the ASPAC Lacrosse Championship) is an international lacrosse competition contested to determine the best lacrosse national team in the Asia Pacific region. The first edition was played in Australia, the same year the Asia Pacific Lacrosse Union was organized. The following edition was held in Japan in 2005. Since then the competition is held every two years. A women's competition was introduced in 2009.

Finals results
Some editions saw the participation of non-national team sides including teams from the United States. The Asia Pacific Lacrosse Union maintain a separate ranking solely for its member national teams.

Men's competition

Women's competition

See also
European Lacrosse Championships

References

 
Recurring sporting events established in 2004
Biennial sporting events
2004 establishments in Asia
2004 establishments in Oceania